Joel Brooks (born December 17, 1949) is an American actor, known for his roles in Stir Crazy, My Sister Sam, Six Feet Under, The Mostly Unfabulous Social Life of Ethan Green and Phil of the Future. Brooks also had a recurring role as a psychologist in Ally McBeal.

Brooks was born in New York City, New York. Brooks had a successful career as a character actor in the 1970s and 1980s. In 1976, he won $10,000 on Pyramid; his celebrity partner was Lucie Arnaz. Twelve years later, in 1988, Arnaz and Brooks were both featured as the week's celebrities.

Brooks appeared in an episode of M*A*S*H as a wounded Italian soldier who fell in love with Margaret and refused to be shipped back to his unit because of his undying love for her. He appeared as a movie director in The Dukes Of Hazzard seventh-season episode "The Dukes in Hollywood". He appeared in an episode in the second season of Night Court as a representative of a cat food and accessories company that wished to reclaim their ostensibly stolen feline mascot. He also appeared in two episodes of Three's Company as Dr. Prescott, a psychologist Jack sees to build his self-confidence.

In 1980, he played Gene Wilder and Richard Pryor's lawyer in the movie Stir Crazy. He played gay Secret Service Agent Randy in the short run of Hail To The Chief. Brooks was featured in two episodes of The Facts of Life as Edna Garrett's son Raymond and reprised that role in the 2001 reunion film.

In the 1990s, his career continued in such hit shows as Star Trek: Deep Space Nine, where he played Falow in the episode "Move Along Home". In 1998, Brooks played Emperor Larry, the cousin of Sabrina Spellman on the television series Sabrina, the Teenage Witch.

In the early 2000s, he appeared in seven episodes of HBO's hit series Six Feet Under as Robbie, Ruth Fisher's caustic gay co-worker who offers advice on how to accept her son David's homosexuality. In 2008 he appeared in an episode of The Big Bang Theory as a Jewish professor from whom Sheldon seeks advice in the episode "The Jerusalem Duality".

In 2020, he appeared twice in the Full House revival series Fuller House on Netflix as an FBI Agent in the episode "Five Dates with Kimmy Gibbler" and Agent Cooper in the finale episode "Our Very Last Show, Again".

Brooks is currently involved in teaching an audition techniques class, Auditions LA. In 2014, he guest-starred on The Young and the Restless as the judge in the trial of Ian Ward v. Nikki Newman.

Film

Television

External links
 
 

1949 births
Living people
20th-century American male actors
21st-century American male actors
American male television actors
Contestants on American game shows
Male actors from New York City